Spilosoma metaleuca is a moth in the family Erebidae. It was described by George Hampson in 1905. It is found in the Democratic Republic of the Congo, Eritrea, Nigeria and Sudan.

Description
Head and thorax orange yellow; abdomen orange yellow, white at base and with ill-defined dorsal fuscous hands. Forewing uniform orange yellow. Hindwing pure white.

The wingspan for the male is 28 mm and the female is 36 mm.

References

Spilosoma metaleuca at Markku Savela's Lepidoptera and Some Other Life Forms

Moths described in 1905
metaleuca